PSR J0002+6216, also dubbed the Cannonball Pulsar, is a pulsar discovered by the Einstein@Home project in 2017. The star rotates at a rate of 8.7 times a second.

References

External links
 AstroSurf, Abell 85 (CTB 1)

Pulsars
Cassiopeia (constellation)